Victor Sterpu (born 14 June 1999) is a Moldovan judoka. He won the gold medal in the men's 73 kg event at the 2020 European Judo Championships held in Prague, Czech Republic. In July 2021, he competed in the men's 73 kg event at the 2020 Summer Olympics in Tokyo, Japan.

Career
He competed in the men's 73 kg event at the 2018 World Judo Championships held in Baku, Azerbaijan. In that same year, he won one of the bronze medals in the men's 73 kg event at the 2018 Judo Grand Prix The Hague held in The Hague, Netherlands. The following year, he competed in the men's 73 kg event at the 2019 World Judo Championships held in Tokyo, Japan.

In 2019, he represented Moldova at the European Games held in Minsk, Belarus. He competed in the men's 73 kg event and he was eliminated in his first match.

In 2021, he competed in the men's 73 kg event at the Judo World Masters held in Doha, Qatar. He also competed in the men's 73 kg event at the 2021 World Judo Championships held in Budapest, Hungary where he was eliminated in his second match by Sulaiman Hamad of Saudi Arabia.

Achievements

References

External links
 

Living people
1999 births
Place of birth missing (living people)
Moldovan male judoka
European Games competitors for Moldova
Judoka at the 2019 European Games
Judoka at the 2020 Summer Olympics
Olympic judoka of Moldova
21st-century Moldovan people